The 1890 Princeton Tigers football team represented Princeton University in the 1890 college football season. The team finished with an 11–1–1 record. The Tigers recorded nine shutouts and outscored opponents by a combined total of 478 to 58. The team's only loss was by a 32–0 score against Yale and they tied the Orange Athletic Club 0–0.

Three Princeton players, fullback Sheppard Homans, Jr., end Ralph Warren, and guard Jesse Riggs, were consensus first-team honorees on the 1890 College Football All-America Team.  In 1952, Grantland Rice paid tribute to Homans as the embodiment of the rough and tumble days of iron man football. Rice wrote: "Just as Ty Cobb represents the ball game of many years ago, this man represented the football that used to be."

The 115–0 defeat of Virginia is often marked as the beginning of major college football's arrival in the South.

Schedule

References

Princeton
Princeton Tigers football seasons
Princeton Tigers football